Glen Martin is a scattered rural community located within the Hunter Region of New South Wales, Australia. It is part of the Dungog local government area.

Not a lot is known about the early history of Glen Martin, but the name most likely comes from an early estate at the time of settlement. Records show that there was once a public school, community hall and Post Office in the area; none of these buildings stand today. In 2016 the population was 172 with a median age of 47. 86.6% of the population were born in Australia.

References

External links 
 http://www.dungog.nsw.gov.au/

Suburbs of Dungog Shire